The lance-tailed manakin (Chiroxiphia lanceolata) is a small passerine bird which breeds in tropical Central and South America from Costa Rica to northern Venezuela. This manakin is a fairly common bird of dry and moist deciduous forests, but not rainforest. Males have black plumage with a blue back, a red crown and orange legs. Females and juveniles are olive-green with paler underparts. At breeding time, males are involved in a cooperative behaviour during which they jump up and down alternately. This is a fairly common species with a wide range, and the International Union for Conservation of Nature has rated its conservation status as being of "least concern".

Description
Like other manakins, the lance-tailed manakin is a compact, brightly coloured forest bird, typically 13.5 cm long and weighing 17.5 g. Both sexes have bring orange legs and two central tail feathers elongated to form a spike. 

Females are olive-green, with slightly paler underparts. Most females are solid green, however, a small portion have tawny or red caps.  Adult males are mostly black, with a red cap and sky-blue back.  Young males are olive but show a red cap and the start of a blue back as they mature. Male lance-tailed manakins do not reach their full adult plumage until approximately 26 months after hatching.

This species is similar to blue-backed manakin, Chiroxiphia pareola, which breeds further south and east, but the latter lacks the spiky tail, and the male has a somewhat darker blue back.

Ecology
The male lance-tailed manakin has an interesting breeding display, unusual in that it is cooperative rather than competitive. Two males perch next to each other on a bare stick and jump up and down alternately, sometimes giving short flights. Groups of birds may perform together, with a different stick for each pair of displaying males. The female builds a cup nest in a tree; two brown-mottled cream eggs are laid, and incubated entirely by the female for about 20 days.

The lance-tailed manakin has a number of calls, including a Toe-LEE-do, a curry-ho, and a frog-like buzzing croak given by displaying males.

These manakins eat fruit and some insects.

Status
This bird has a very wide range, is fairly common and is presumed to have a large total population. The population trend is thought to be stable and the International Union for Conservation of Nature has rated the bird's conservation status as being of "least concern".

References

 Birds of Venezuela by Hilty, 

lance-tailed manakin
Birds of Panama
Birds of Colombia
Birds of Venezuela
lance-tailed manakin